Bocchoris borbonensis is a moth of the family Crambidae described by Christian Guillermet in 1996. It can be found in Réunion. where it can be found in remaining natural habitats of dry areas.

It has a wingspan of 14–15 mm.

References

External links
Flickr.com - pictures of Bocchoris borbonensis
Lépidoptères de La Réunion - pictures of Bocchoris borbonensis

Moths described in 1996
Spilomelinae
Moths of Réunion
Endemic fauna of Réunion